Lixus may refer to:

 lixus, the Latin word for "boiled"
 Lixus (ancient city) in Morocco
 Lixus (beetle), a genus of true weevils
 Lixus (mythology), one of the sons of Aegyptus and Caliadne in Greek mythology, who married (and was murdered by) Cleodora, daughter of Danaus and Polyxo